Hazen is an unincorporated community in Jefferson County, in the U.S. state of Pennsylvania.

History
Hazen was originally called Maysville, and named for John Mayes, the owner of a local store. The present name of Hazen was adopted when the post office was established. A post office opened at Hazen in 1882, and was operated until it was discontinued in 1982.

References

Unincorporated communities in Jefferson County, Pennsylvania
Unincorporated communities in Pennsylvania